WOKK (97.1 FM, "97 OKK") is a country music-formatted radio station broadcasting in the Meridian, Mississippi, Arbitron market. Its transmitter is located on Mississippi Highway 145 south of Meridian. From 1970 to 1983, the callsign was WALT and until 1981 was formatted as a top-40 station. The growth of competitor WJDQ "Q-101" prompted WALT to adopt an easy-listening format, much to the chagrin of its listeners. But the format change was short-lived. In 1983 the station swapped with WOKK (AM 910) and adopted the WOKK country format. Since the swap, WOKK 97.1 has been one of the most listened-to stations in the area.

WOKK is part of the Alert FM digital-alert and messaging system for Lauderdale County first responders.

References

External links
WOKK official website

OKK
Country radio stations in the United States